Perforin-1 is a protein that in humans is encoded by the PRF1 gene and the Prf1 gene in mice.

Function
Perforin is a pore forming cytolytic protein found in the granules of cytotoxic T lymphocytes (CTLs) and natural killer cells (NK cells). Upon degranulation, perforin molecules translocate to the target cell with the help of calreticulin, which works as a chaperone protein to prevent perforin from degrading. Perforin then binds to the target cell's plasma membrane via membrane phospholipids while phosphatidylcholine binds calcium ions to increase perforin's affinity to the membrane. Perforin oligomerises in a Ca2+ dependent manner to form pores on the target cell. The pore formed allows for the passive diffusion of a family of pro-apoptotic proteases, known as the granzymes, into the target cell. The lytic membrane-inserting part of perforin is the MACPF domain. This region shares homology with cholesterol-dependent cytolysins from Gram-positive bacteria.

Perforin has structural and functional similarities to complement component 9 (C9). Like C9, this protein creates transmembrane tubules and is capable of lysing non-specifically a variety of target cells. This protein is one of the main cytolytic proteins of cytolytic granules, and it is known to be a key effector molecule for T-cell- and natural killer-cell-mediated cytolysis. Perforin is thought to act by creating holes in the plasma membrane which triggers an influx of calcium and initiates membrane repair mechanisms. These repair mechanisms bring perforin and granzymes into early endosomes.

Clinical significance
Homozygous inheritance of defective PRF1 alleles result in the development of familial hemophagocytic lymphohistiocytosis type 2 (FHL2), a rare and lethal autosomal recessive disorder of infancy.

Interactions
Perforin has been shown to interact with calreticulin.

See also
Granzymes
Defensin
Complement membrane attack complex

References

Further reading

External links

Programmed cell death
Proteins